XHZAZ-FM is a radio station on 99.3 FM in Zacatecas City, Zacatecas, Mexico. It is owned by Grupo Radiorama and operated by Grupo Radiofónico ZER, carrying a romantic format under the name Amor Es.

History

XEZAZ-AM 1120, a 250-watt daytimer, received its concession on November 30, 1994. It was owned by Voz y Música, S.A., a Radiorama subsidiary. XEZAZ quickly moved to 970 with 1,000 watts day and 500 night.

XEZAZ was cleared to move to FM in November 2010.

Until 2017, XHZAZ used ACIR's Amor romantic music format, which it dumped in 2017 with a subtle name change to "Amor Es".

References

1994 establishments in Mexico
Radio stations established in 1994
Radio stations in Zacatecas